Ernst Erwin Oehme (18 September 1831 in Dresden – 10 October 1907 in Blasewitz) was a German painter known mainly for his  oils and watercolor paintings of landscapes, architectural views, genre scenes and portraits.

Biography
He was son and pupil of Ernst Ferdinand Oehme, a landscape painter. He attended the Dresden Academy of Art, and for a short time worked under Ludwig Richter, after which he made an artistic tour through Germany, Switzerland, England and France. His studies of nature during his travels were the main influence on his style.

Works
He painted, in oils and watercolors, landscapes, architectural views, genre and portraits. The court theatre at Dresden was decorated by him. For several royal palaces, he painted a series of tapestries in watercolor, in imitation of Gobelin tapestry.

In 1877 he executed three mural paintings representing the “Rape of the Saxon Princes in 1415” in the banquet hall of the Albrechtsburg at Meissen, and in 1887-89 painted the “Declaration of Venezuela's Independence by Bolivar,” a picture in heroic size for the House of Parliament at Caracas. For Queen Carola of Saxony, he produced a collection of views of Compiègne. Other notable works include “Funeral in Spreewald”, “Stone Quarry in Saxon Switzerland”, “Bear Hunt” (in watercolor) and “The Valley of Montafont”.

Notes

References

 
 

1831 births
1907 deaths
19th-century German painters
19th-century German male artists
German male painters
20th-century German painters
20th-century German male artists
Artists from Dresden